Anton Schaller (born 1944 in Nottwil) is a Swiss journalist, news presenter and politician (LdU).

Schaller was chief editor of the evening news Tagesschau on the Swiss television channel SF 1 and directed the Federal Palace editorial team. In 1999 he was elected to the National Council of Switzerland as the last representative of the Alliance of Independents.

References

External links 

 
 

1944 births
Living people
People from Nottwil
People from Sursee District
Alliance of Independents politicians
Members of the National Council (Switzerland)
Swiss television journalists